Yoake Dam is a gravity dam located in Fukuoka Prefecture in Japan. The dam is used for power production. The catchment area of the dam is 1440 km2. The dam impounds about 85.3  ha of land when full and can store 4050 thousand cubic meters of water. The construction of the dam was started on 1951 and completed in 1954.

References

Dams in Fukuoka Prefecture
1954 establishments in Japan